The Rector Street station was on the demolished IRT Sixth Avenue Line in Manhattan, New York City. It had three tracks and two side platforms. It opened on June 5, 1878, served by trains from the IRT Sixth Avenue Line, and was one block east of Rector Street El Station on the IRT Ninth Avenue Line. In 1918, Brooklyn Rapid Transit Company built the Broadway Subway through Manhattan and added a station at Rector Street, which served as competition for the 6th Avenue Line station. The el station closed on December 4, 1938. The next southbound stop was Battery Place on the IRT Ninth Avenue Line. The next northbound stop was Cortlandt Street.

References

External links
The Sixth Avenue Rector Street station seen in a colorized motion picture from 1916

IRT Sixth Avenue Line stations
Railway stations in the United States opened in 1878
Railway stations closed in 1938
Former elevated and subway stations in Manhattan
1878 establishments in New York (state)
1938 disestablishments in New York (state)